The following is a list of episodes of the public television cooking show, Cook's Country, in the United States. The program started with 13 shows in 2008.

Series Overview

Season 1 (2008)

Season 2 (2009)

Season 3 (2010)

Season 4 (2011–2012)

Season 5 (2012)

Season 6 (2013)

Season 7 (2014)

Season 8 (2015) 
Season 8 is hosted by Christopher Kimball. Test cooks Bridget Lancaster, Julia Collin Davison, and Erin McMurrer demonstrate recipes. Jack Bishop is in charge of the Tasting Lab and Adam Ried features new products during the Equipment Review.

Season 9 (2016) 
Season 9 is the final season hosted by Christopher Kimball. Test cooks Bridget Lancaster, Julia Collin Davison, Erin McMurrer, Ashley Moore, and Christie Morrison demonstrate recipes. Jack Bishop is in charge of the Tasting Lab and Adam Ried features new products during the Equipment Review.

Season 10 (2017) 
Season 10 is the first season hosted by Bridget Lancaster and Julia Collin Davison. Test cooks Bryan Roof, Christie Morrison, and Ashley Moore demonstrate recipes. Jack Bishop is in charge of the Tasting Lab and Adam Ried features new products during the Equipment Review.

Season 11 (2018) 
Season 11 is the first season to be filmed at the new farmhouse set at America's Test Kitchen's test facility in Boston, Massachusetts.

Season 12 (2019)

Season 13 (2020)

Season 14 (2021)

Season 15 (2022)

References

External links
Official Website

Cook's Country